General Phipps may refer to:

Edmund Phipps (British Army officer) (1760–1837), British Army general
Jeremy Phipps (1942–2021), British Army major general
Henry Phipps, 1st Earl of Mulgrave (1755–1831), British Army general
Edmund Phipps-Hornby (1857–1947), British Army brigadier general